The 2013–14 Euro Hockey League was the sixth season of the Euro Hockey League, Europe's premier club field hockey tournament organized by the European Hockey Federation. The group phase was held in Barcelona, Spain, and Lille, France, in October 2013 and the knockout stage was held in Eindhoven, Netherlands in April 2014.

The final was played between Harvestehude and Oranje Zwart at Sportpark Aalsterweg, Eindhoven, Netherlands. Harvestehude defeated the hosts Oranje Zwart 3–1 in a shoot-out after a 1–1 draw. Bloemendaal were the defending champions but they did not qualify for this season's edition. Dragons took the bronze medal.

Association team allocation
A total of 24 teams from 12 of the 45 EHF member associations participated in the 2013–14 Euro Hockey League. The association ranking based on the EHL country coefficients is used to determine the number of participating teams for each association:
 Associations 1–4 each have three teams qualify.
 Associations 5–8 each have two teams qualify.
 Associations 9–12 each have one team qualify.

EHL Rankings

Teams

Group phase
The 24 teams were drawn into eight pools of three. In each pool, teams played against each other once in a round-robin format. The pool winners and runners-up advanced to the round of 16. Pools D, E, F, and G were played in Barcelona, Spain, from 11 to 13 October 2013 and the other pools were played in Lille, France, from 25 to 27 October 2013. If a game was won, the winning team received five points. A draw resulted in both teams receiving two points. A loss gave the losing team one point unless the losing team lost by three or more goals, then they received zero points.

Pool A

Pool B

Pool C

Pool D

Pool E

Pool F

Pool G

Pool H

Knockout stage
The knockout stage was played in Eindhoven, Netherlands from 16 to 21 April 2014.

Bracket

Quarter-finals

Semi-finals

Third place

Final

Notes

References

External links 
 Official Website (English)
 YouTube Channel for EHL
 European Hockey Federation

Euro Hockey League
2013–14 in European field hockey